Mallotus thunbergianus is a species of evergreen plant in the family Euphorbiaceae. It is endemic to island of Sri Lanka.

References

thunbergianus
Endemic flora of Sri Lanka